Charles Bélec (December 23, 1872 in Fort Coulonge, Quebec, Canada – January 16, 1958) was a Canadian politician and farmer. He was elected to the House of Commons of Canada in the 1930 election as a Member of the Conservative Party to represent the riding of Pontiac.

The son of Charles Bélec and Thersile Gervais, he operated a farm near Fort Coulonge. Bélec was married twice: to a Miss Bertrand in 1894 and to Louise Gervais in 1904.

Prior to his federal political experience, he was twice elected mayor of Mansfield and Pontrefact, Quebec in 1902 and 1924 serving one year terms.

He ran unsuccessfully for a seat in the Quebec assembly in 1923.

References

External links
 

1872 births
1958 deaths
Conservative Party of Canada (1867–1942) MPs
Members of the House of Commons of Canada from Quebec